Rebecca Stevens may refer to:

Rebecca Stevens (first lady), First Lady of Sierra Leone from 1971 to 1985
Rebecca "Becky" Stevens, a character in the children's television series Grange Hill
Rebecca Stevens (comics), a Marvel character

See also
 Rebecca Stephens (disambiguation)